Haplochromis riponianus is a species of cichlid found in Lake Victoria and possibly in the adjacent reaches of the Nile.  This species can reach a length of  SL.

References

riponianus
Fish described in 1911
Taxonomy articles created by Polbot